Belasagar Lake it is situated 10 km south of Kulpahar in Belatal village of Mahoba, Uttar Pradesh, India. This lake is a source for irrigation in the area. This lake is also known as Bela Taal locally.

References

 Economics of Irrigation Rates: A Study in Punjab and Uttar Pradesh; By Nasim Ansari (minor mention ) 
 Irrigation Administration Report of Uttar Pradesh.  By Irrigation Dept (minor mention)
Water in Bundelkhand
Tourist Spots in District Mahoba 

Lakes of Uttar Pradesh
Bundelkhand
Tourist attractions in Mahoba district